Shahadat Hossain (born 1986) is a Bangladeshi cricketer.

Shahadat Hossain may also refer to:
 Shahadat Hossain (actor) (born 1976), Bangladeshi actor and radio personality
 Shahadat Hossain (cricketer, born 2002), Bangladeshi cricketer
 Shahadat Hossain (politician), Bangladeshi politician